The Union for the Republic (UPR) was a political party in Mauritania. The party was formed in 2009 by Mohamed Ould Abdel Aziz after he resigned from the military, to run for President of Mauritania. Aziz resigned as chairman of the party on 2 August 2009 after winning the presidential election, as the President of Mauritania cannot be a member of any party. The party also won 13 of the 17 seats up for re-election to the Mauritanian Senate in 2009, giving the UPR control of a total of 38 of the 53 Senate seats.

As a result of the 2018 parliamentary election, UPR became the largest political party in Mauritania. Four major political parties merged into the Union for the Republic after the election. On October 18, 2018, a month after the previous legislative election, the Unionist Party for the Construction of Mauritania voted to merge itself into the UPR. On the 21st, Choura for Development adopted the same decision, while centrist El Wiam, which used to be on the moderate opposition, did the same on the 29th. The last party to merge into the UPR was the National Pact for Democracy and Development, which was the previous ruling party from 2007 until 2008's coup. PNDD-ADIL merged into the UPR on December 27, 2019.

The party refounded itself as the Equity Party in July 2022.

Election results

Presidential

National Assembly elections

Presidents of the Union for the Republic
 Mohamed Ould Abdel Aziz, 5 May 2009 – 2 August 2009
 Mohamed Mahmoud Ould Mohamed Lemine, 2 August 2009 – 29 December 2019
 Sidi Mohamed Ould Taleb Omar, 29 December 2019 – 3 July 2022

References

External links
Official web site

Political parties in Mauritania
Political parties established in 2009
Political parties disestablished in 2022